A list of films produced by the Marathi language film industry based in Maharashtra in the year 1999.

1999 Releases
A list of Marathi films released in 1999.

References

Lists of 1999 films by country or language
 Marathi
1999